Rawatpura may refer to:

 Rawatpura, Kulpahar, a village in Uttar Pradesh, India
 Rawatpura, Bhopal, a village in Madhya Pradesh, India